Ry is a commune in the Seine-Maritime department in the Normandy region in northern France.

Geography

The village of Yonville in Gustave Flaubert's Madame Bovary is traditionally held to have been based on Ry.

Population

Places of interest

 The church of St. Sulpice, dating from the twelfth century.
 The eighteenth century Château de Vascoeuil.
 The automaton museum.

See also
Communes of the Seine-Maritime department

References

External links

 Photos of the church of Saint-Sulpice at Ry 
 Official village website 

Communes of Seine-Maritime
Seine-Maritime communes articles needing translation from French Wikipedia